Nationality words link to articles with information on the nation's poetry or literature (for instance, Irish or France).

Events
1195:
Folquet de Marselha gives up poetry to take up the religious life

1197:
 Salh d'Escola enters a cloister in Bergerac and gives up composing

1198:
 Bertran de Born's last datable poem

1199:
Gaucelm Faidit composes a planh on the death of Richard I of England

Works published
1190:
 Probable approx. date of The Tale of Igor's Campaign (Old Ukrainian: , Slovo o pŭlku Igorevě)

1192:
 Approx. date of Layla and Majnun by Nezami

Births
Death years link to the corresponding "[year] in poetry" article. There are conflicting or unreliable sources for the birth years of many people born in this period; where sources conflict, the poet is listed again and the conflict is noted:

1190:
 Gonzalo de Berceo (died 1264), Spanish poet especially on religious themes
 Pietro della Vigna (died 1249), Italian jurist, diplomat, poet, and sonneteer of the Sicilian School
 Yuan Haowen (died 1257), Chinese Sanqu poetry writer

1191:
 Janna (died unknown), Kannada poet

1193:
 Shang Dao (died 1258), Chinese Sanqu poet

1196:
Alberico da Romano (died 1260), patron and troubadour

1198:
 Fujiwara no Tameie (died 1275), Japanese poet

Deaths
Birth years link to the corresponding "[year] in poetry" article:

1190:
 Khaqani Shirvani (born 1121/1122), Persian
 Saigyō Hōshi (born 1118), Japan

1193:
 Fan Chengda (born 1126), Song

1196:
 Alfonso II of Aragon (born 1157), an Occitan troubadour
 Basava (born 1134), writing in Kannada
 Guilhem de Berguedan (born 1130), troubadour

1197:
 Henry VI, Holy Roman Emperor (born 1165)
 Owain Cyfeiliog (born 1130), one of the Welsh Poets of the Princes
 Ermengarde, Viscountess of Narbonne, patron of troubadours

1198:
 Tibors de Sarenom (born 1130), trobairitz

1199:
April 6 – Richard I of England (born 1157), Poitevin and Occitan poet

See also

 Poetry
 12th century in poetry
 12th century in literature
 List of years in poetry

Other events:
 Other events of the 12th century
 Other events of the 13th century

12th century:
 12th century in poetry
 12th century in literature

Notes

12th-century poetry
Poetry